Paulo Diego Messias dos Santos or Didi  (born August 9, 1987) is a Brazilian football player previously play for Persiba Balikpapan in Indonesia Super League. He left Persiba after his debut against Sriwijaya F.C. in the opening match of 2013 Indonesia Super League season, he played for 25 minutes before suffering a severe ankle injury in a collision with the opposing team defender.

References

External links
Paulo Diego Messias dos Santos at LigaIndonesia.co.id
Diego Santos at Goal.com
Diego Santos at Goal.com

1987 births
Living people
Association football forwards
Brazilian footballers
Brazilian expatriate footballers
Brazilian expatriate sportspeople in Indonesia
Expatriate footballers in Indonesia
Liga 1 (Indonesia) players
Persiba Balikpapan players
Association football midfielders
Footballers from Rio de Janeiro (city)